LLP stands for limited liability partnership, a partnership in which some or all partners have limited liabilities.

LLP may also refer to:

Limited liability partnerships in the United Kingdom
The Limited Liability Partnership Act, 2008 (LLP Act) of India
LLP Group, a Czech holding company 
 Long Lap Penalty, a MotoGP penalty introduced in the 2019 MotoGP World Championship

See also

LLLP
LP (disambiguation)
LPP (disambiguation)
PPL (disambiguation)
PLL (disambiguation)